The 1936 United States Senate election in South Dakota took place on November 3, 1936. Incumbent Democratic Senator William J. Bulow ran for re-election to a second term. He was challenged by businessman Chan Gurney, who defeated former Congressman Charles A. Christopherson in the Republican primary. Bulow, likely aided by President Franklin D. Roosevelt's landslide victory in South Dakota, narrowly defeated Gurney to win his second term, though he significantly underperformed Roosevelt.

Democratic Primary
Senator Bulow was the only Democratic candidate to file for the Senate; accordingly, no election occurred and the race did not appear on the primary election ballot.

Republican Primary

Candidates
 Chan Gurney, businessman
 Charles A. Christopherson, former U.S. Congressman from South Dakota's 1st congressional district

Results

General election

Results

References

South Dakota
1936
1936 South Dakota elections